During the 2002–03 English football season, Crystal Palace competed in the Football League First Division.

Season summary
Under Francis, Palace were unable to mount a serious promotion challenge and they finished mid-table in Division One. The main highlight of the season was in February 2003 when Palace knocked Liverpool out of the FA Cup in a fourth round replay at Anfield. Having drawn the first match 0–0 at Selhurst Park, Palace went to Anfield as the clear underdogs. A goal from Julian Gray and an own goal from Liverpool's Stephen Henchoz meant that Palace progressed to a 5th round where they played at home against Leeds United. They lost 2–1 in controversial circumstances, as Palace were denied a first half goal despite the ball clearly crossing the line. Francis resigned on 18 April after another difficult season, and was replaced by long-serving coach Steve Kember.

The end of Francis' tenure, however, saw the beginning of a remarkable, two-year-long transfer saga. Clinton Morrison, a youth team product who had been one of the team's most reliable goalscorers, headed to Birmingham for a £4 million fee in a part-exchange deal which saw Andrew Johnson come to Selhurst Park for £750,000, having been deemed surplus to requirements by Blues boss Steve Bruce. Johnson went on to become an even bigger success at Palace than Morrison, and helped take the club into the Premier League before eventually moving on to Everton for a fee of £8.6million in 2006; Morrison's return to Selhurst Park a year earlier cost Palace £2 million, meaning the club were left with the same player and a total profit of £9,850,000.

Final league table

Players

First-team squad
Squad at end of season

Left club during season

Reserve squad

References

Notes

2002-03
Crystal Palace